Settimo (Italian for seventh) may refer to several places in Italy:

Settimo, a hamlet of Cinto Caomaggiore, in the Province of Venice
Settimo Milanese, a municipality in the Province of Milan 
Settimo Rottaro, a municipality in the Province of Turin 
Settimo San Pietro, a municipality in the Province of Cagliari 
Settimo Torinese, a municipality in the Province of Turin
Settimo Vittone, a municipality in the Province of Turin